Aleksandr Grigoryevich Sakovich (born 31 March 1998) is a Russian football player. He plays for Kuban-Holding.

Club career
He made his debut in the Russian Football National League for FC Tom Tomsk on 3 November 2019 in a game against FC Luch Vladivostok.

References

External links
 
 
 Profile by Russian Football National League

1998 births
Living people
People from Kemerovo Oblast
Sportspeople from Kemerovo Oblast
Russian footballers
Association football midfielders
Russian expatriate footballers
Expatriate footballers in Belarus
FC Tom Tomsk players
FC Saturn Ramenskoye players
FC Vitebsk players